Steelbands, originating from Trinidad and Tobago, are groups of musicians who play steelpan instruments including the Tenor, Double Tenor, Double Second, Cello, Guitar, Quadrophonic and Bass together as an orchestral ensemble, often with expansive percussion and rhythm section.

This is a list of notable steelbands organized by country.

Trinidad and Tobago

United Kingdom

References

 
Lists of bands